This page lists the armoury (emblazons=graphics and blazons=heraldic descriptions; or coats of arms) of the communes from D-H in Oise (department 60)

Other pages:

 Armorial of the Communes of Oise (A–C)
 Armorial of the Communes of Oise (D–H)
 Armorial of the Communes of Oise (I–P)
 Armorial of the Communes of Oise (Q–Z)

D

E

F

G

H

References 

Oise
Oise